Parakampimodromus is a genus of mites in the Phytoseiidae family.

Species
 Parakampimodromus trichophilus (Blommers, 1976)

References

Phytoseiidae